Valery Benediktovich Nosik (Валерий Бенедиктович Носик, 9 October 1940, Moscow, USSR,  — 4 January 1995, Moscow, Russian Federation) was a Soviet Russian film and stage actor, the People's Artist of Russia (1994) who appeared in more than 100 films, as well as in numerous stage productions at the Moscow Pushkin Drama (1965-1972) and the Maly Theatres (1972-1995).

Biography
Valery Nosik was born in 1940 to Benedict Nosek, a Pole who in the 1900s came to settle in Ukraine, and 'simplified' his surname by changing a letter. He then married Alexandra Subbotina, a Russian girl from Kashira, and moved to Moscow. Valery's younger brother Vladimir Nosik was born in 1948 (to become later an actor too).

As a schoolboy, Valery Nosik attended the Youth Theatre studio based at the ZiL Culture Club, where he was tutored by Sergey Stein. After the graduation he enrolled in the VGIK institute to study in Mikhail Romm's class. Long before the graduation in 1963 Nosik made his screen debut in Knock Every Door (1958) directed by Maria Fyodorova. From then on he was cast regularly, mainly in peripheral, but memorable comedy roles which, according to a biographer, "had a way of lightening up even the dullest of films." Only occasionally was he provided the opportunity to demonstrate his dramatic talent, which he did in Horizon (1961), Scrambled Boots (1977) and Shura and Prosvirnyak (1987), to impressive effect.

Up until 1965 Nosik worked at the Moscow Young Viewer's Theatre, then joined the Moscow Pushkin Drama Theatre. In 1972 he moved to the Maly Theatre where he worked up until his death of heart attack, on 4 January 1995. Valery Benediktovich Nosik is deterred at the Troyekurovskoye Cemetery in Moscow.

Private life
Valery Nosik's first wife was actress Liya Akhedzhakova, his second - actress Maria Sternikova. In this marriage which lasted nine years, their son Alexander Nosik was born in 1971, who later became an actor too.

Selected filmography
 Introduction to Life (Вступление, 1962) as Romka
 Operation Y and Shurik's Other Adventures (Операция „Ы“ и другие приключения Шурика, 1965) as student-gambler
 The Tale of Tsar Saltan (1966) as servant
 Crime and Punishment (Преступление и наказание, 1970) as Zametov
 Liberation (Освобождение, 1970) as Dorozhkin
 As Ilf and Petrov rode a tram (Ехали в трамвае Ильф и Петров, 1972) as Kipyatkov
 Ruslan and Ludmila (Руслан и Людмила, 1972) as messenger
 Big School-Break (Большая перемена, 1973) as Otto Fukin
 Adventures in a City that does not Exist (Приключения в городе, которого нет, 1974) as informant "Mustache"
 Incognito from St. Petersburg (Инкогнито из Петербурга, 1977) as Luka Lukich Khlopov
 Simply Awful! (Просто ужас, 1982) as hunter
 Vertical Race (Гонки по вертикали, 1983) as airport employee
 Promised Heaven (Небеса обетованные, 1991) as bum
 Dreams (Сны, 1993) as Minister of Culture of Russia
 The Master and Margarita (Мастер и Маргарита, 1994) as Aloysius Mogarych (uncredited)
 Za co? (За что?, 1995) as charioteer

References

External links

Russian male actors
1940 births
1995 deaths
Gerasimov Institute of Cinematography alumni
Burials in Troyekurovskoye Cemetery
People's Artists of Russia
Soviet male actors
Honored Artists of the RSFSR
Male actors from Moscow
Soviet people of Polish descent